The 20 Bristol and Exeter Railway 4-2-2 locomotives were broad gauge 4-2-2 express steam locomotives built for the Bristol and Exeter Railway by the Stothert and Slaughter in Bristol. The first entered service in 1849. The Bristol and Exeter Railway was amalgamated into the Great Western Railway on 1 January 1876 and eight 4-2-2s survived at this time, the last being withdrawn in 1889.

Three of the infamous 4-2-4T locomotives were rebuilt by the Great Western Railway in 1877 as 4-2-2 tender locomotives.

List of locomotives

1849 batch

The Bristol and Exeter Railway's first express passenger locomotives, similar in appearance to the GWR Iron Duke Class.

 1 (1849 – 1875)
 2 (1849 – 1872)
 3 (1849 – 1874)
 4 (1849 – 1871)
 5 (1849 – 1871)
 6 (1849 – 1870)
 7 (1849 – 1885) GWR No. 2007
 8 (1849 – 1872)
 9 (1849 – 1889) GWR No. 2008
 10 (1849 – 1888) GWR No. 2009
 11 (1849 – 1874)
 12 (1849 – 1862)
 13 (1849 – 1878) GWR No. 2010
 14 (1849 – 1870)
 15 (1849 – 1888) GWR No. 2011
 16 (1849 – 1875)
 17 (1849 – 1885) GWR No. 2012
 18 (1849 – 1880) GWR No. 2013
 19 (1849 – 1888) GWR No. 2014
 20 (1849 – 1874)

GWR 4-2-2 rebuilds

Following rebuilding as 4-2-2 tender locomotives at Swindon, the three remaining 8 feet 10 inch 4-2-4T locomotives had slightly smaller 8 feet diameter driving wheels and worked alongside the rigid-framed GWR Rover class and the remaining 1849-built ex-Bristol and Exeter Railway 4-2-2 locomotives on express passenger trains.

 2001 (1877 – 1889) Previously B&ER 42/GWR 2004)
 2002 (1877 – 1890)
 2003 (1877 – 1884)

References
 
 

Broad gauge (7 feet) railway locomotives
4-2-2 locomotives
Bristol and Exeter Railway locomotives
Avonside locomotives
Railway locomotives introduced in 1849
Scrapped locomotives